This is a list of parties contracting to the Ramsar Convention on Wetlands of International Importance Especially as Waterfowl Habitat, also known as the Convention on Wetlands. The convention's mission is "the conservation and wise use of all wetlands through local and national actions and international cooperation, as a contribution towards achieving sustainable development throughout the world". It calls upon contracting parties to recognize the interdependence of humans and the environment as well as the ecological functions of wetlands, such as wildlife habitat, nutrient cycling, and flood control.

The Ramsar Convention is the oldest multilateral international conservation convention and the only one to deal with one habitat or ecosystem type, wetlands. The convention's headquarters are in Gland, Switzerland, and it works closely with the International Union for Conservation of Nature.

The convention was held in the city of Ramsar, Iran, in February 1971 and was originally contracted by seven countries when it came into force on 21 December 1975. , there are 172 contracting parties and 2,471 designated sites covering . 170 of the contracting parties have designated at least one Ramsar site, and 31 of the contracting countries have only one site. The country with the most sites is the United Kingdom with 175. To become a Ramsar site, a site must be nominated by a contracting country, meet at least one of nine criteria, and undergo scientific review.

The table lists the countries contracting to the convention, the entry date of each country to the convention, the number of Ramsar sites in each country, and the total area of all Ramsar sites in each country.

See also
 List of Ramsar wetlands of international importance
 Ramsar Classification System for Wetland Type
 Ramsar Convention
 Ramsar Wetland Conservation Award

References

Ramsar
Ramsar Convention
Ramsar Convention